Dichrorampha agilana is a moth belonging to the family Tortricidae first described by Johan Martin Jakob von Tengström in 1848.

It is native to Europe.

References

Grapholitini